Giovanni Francesco Zulatti (1762–1805) was a physician born in Lixouri, Cephalonia (Ionian Islands, today Greece) and author of the book Della forza della Musica nelle passioni, nei costumi e dell’ uso medico del Ballo (Venice, 1787).

1762 births
1805 deaths
18th-century Italian physicians
People from Paliki